Dennis Hogan (born 1 March 1985) is an Irish professional boxer who is the current IBO Super Welterweight World Champion and has challenged for world championships in two weight classes; the WBO light-middleweight and WBC middleweight titles, both in 2019.

Personal life  
Hogan currently lives in Newstead, Queensland, Australia.

Amateur boxing career 
Hogan gathered an extensive amateur career of over 150 fights in Ireland. He lost to the 2008 Olympic Finalist Kenny Egan in the semifinals of the 2009 Irish Selection Tournament, 2009 and 2010 Irish Nationals. He has won the All Ireland Light Heavyweight Championship.

Professional boxing career

Early career 
Hogan made his professional debut in a winning effort against Marlon Toby by corner retirement (RTD) on 1 April 2011.

During his second professional boxing match, he fought Australian boxer, Ben Dyer, in collecting his first knockout victory within the 3rd round on 13 May 2011.

In his third bout, he gained his first draw by drawing debutant Edmund Eramiha on 17 June 2011.

Hogan received his first title opportunity facing Glen Fitzpatrick for the vacant Australian Queensland State super middleweight title where Hogan won by technical knockout (TKO), 1:58 into 4th round.

On 5 December 2015, Hogan received his first major title opportunity facing Jack Culcay for the WBA Interim super welterweight title where Hogan lost by unanimous decision (UD), the first loss of his career.

Hogan vs. Munguía 

On 13 April 2019, Hogan was assigned the mandatory challenger to face a returning Jaime Munguía for his title. Munguía won by a controversial majority decision (MD).

Hogan vs. Charlo  

On 7 December 2019, Hogan faced Jermall Charlo who was set to defend his WBC middleweight title. Hogan was ranked #5 by the WBC at middleweight. Charlo dropped Hogan twice, once in the fourth and once in the seventh round. Charlo managed to get a TKO victory over Hogan in the seventh round. Hogan managed to get up from the second knockdown in the seventh round, but the referee, Charlie Fitch, decided to award Charlo the TKO victory.

Hogan vs. Tszyu 

On 31 March 2021, Hogan, who was ranked #10 by the WBO, was set to face Tim Tszyu who was ranked #9 by The Ring, #1 by the WBO, #3 by the IBF, #7 by the WBA and #11 by the WBC. Tszyu defeated Hogan in the fifth round by technical knockout.

Hogan vs. Browne 

On 17 November 2021, Hogan faced Tommy Browne where Hogan broke his three-match losing streak by defeating Browne by unanimous decision.

Professional boxing record

References

External links 

https://www.tapology.com/fightcenter/fighters/214924-dennis-hogan-hurrican

Living people
1985 births
Irish male boxers
Australian male boxers
Boxers from Brisbane
People from Kildare (town)
Sportspeople from County Kildare
Super-middleweight boxers
Middleweight boxers
Light-middleweight boxers